Small Circle Jujitsu is a style of jujutsu developed by Wally Jay that focuses on employing dual simultaneous push/pull actions and smooth transitions.

History 

Wally Jay primarily studied Danzan-ryū jujutsu under Seishiro Okazaki (also known as Henry S. Okazaki) in Hawaii. He was awarded a Certificate of Mastery from Okazaki on 1948-02-22. Previously he had studied boxing and judo. As Wally Jay gained knowledge and experience in the martial arts, he became focused on improving traditional techniques. Ultimately, it was during his two years of training under the Hawaiian Judo Champion, Ken Kawachi, which gave him the principles he needed to formulate his system of Small Circle JuJitsu. Kawachi had stressed wrist action to gain superior leverage against an opponent. This wrist action is prevalent in Small Circle Jujitsu techniques and over the years Wally Jay made radical changes in the techniques he acquired.

He has produced many national, state, and regional judo and jujitsu champions. In 1968 David Quinonez and in 1970 Bradford Burgo were recipients of the Yamaguchi Award "for their outstanding showing" when they captured the 120 pound crown.

Development 
Small circle jujitsu techniques are smooth and functional because of the integration of the flow, in which interchangeable techniques are used to counterattack. The flow emphasises the smooth transition between various locks and throws in order to remove any "hard stops". It allows a practitioner to seamlessly transition between techniques and makes counter-measures against opponents quicker and smoother.

Small Circle Jujitsu continues to evolve from a combination of various martial arts theories, styles and movements. It contains Ten Principles, which were guidelines by which a practitioner of Small Circle JuJitsu could improve upon the fundamental basics involved in the functionality of their technique.

During the 1990s Wally Jay, Remy Presas (Modern Arnis), and Jack Hogan (Kyusho Jitsu) traveled together throughout the United States and worldwide promulgating small-circle jujitsu.
Through Remy Presas elements of Small Circle JuJitsu have been integrated into Modern Arnis.

Jack Hogan continues to promote and advance the principles of small-circle jujitsu having incorporated a multitude of the techniques into Hogan Karate International and the Kyusho Certification Program.

Ten Principles 
Balance
Mobility and Stability
Avoid the Head On Collision of Forces
Mental Resistance and Distraction
Focus to the Smallest Point Possible
Energy Transfer
Create a Base
Sticking Control and Sensitivity
Rotational Momentum
Transitional Flow (which includes):
  Exert Continual Pain During Transitions
  Create Maximum Pain Without Dislocating Joint
  Mobility During Transition Rather than Stability

See also 
Chin Na

Footnotes

References 
Small-Circle Jujitsu (August 1989) 
Dynamic Ju Jitsu

External links
Small Circle Jujitsu

 Small Circle Jujitsu - Montpellier

 Small Circle Jujitsu - France

Jujutsu
North American martial arts
Martial arts in the United States
Hybrid martial arts